The Beloit International Film Festival (BIFF) is an annual film festival in Beloit, Wisconsin, usually held in mid-February. The first edition of the festival took place in 2006. BIFF has evolved from a single weekend to now span 10 days and seven venues. Most venues are in downtown Beloit and within easy walking distance between each. With more than 300 volunteers, it is a community-wide effort, welcoming filmmakers from across the nation and around the world.

History
The first Beloit International Film Festival was presented at a half-dozen venues throughout Beloit's downtown area. It started as a long weekend, with social events going into the night. One of the earliest events was the Silent Film Showcase, presenting films from the silent era accompanied by music performed by the local symphony orchestra. Another early project that continues today is the "Kids at BIFF" program, where fifth graders watch and discuss films.

In 2012, BIFF expanded to 10 days and added films by local filmmakers from Wisconsin and Illinois. The Wisconsin-Illinois Showdown takes place the first weekend of BIFF. In 2014, BIFF became a year-round festival with films shown weekly. In summer, BIFF shows family films at parks in the area.

Selected films are shown in small venues, seating 30–100, most within walking distance of one another. Other events include the annual BIFF Sing Along musical, the final Classic Film Showcase, the Silent Film Showcase, and BIFF CARES, which groups films with a social theme.

Events
 BIFF Year 'Round — weekly screening of films under consideration for the next festival, allowing attendees to vote on inclusion
 BIFF Outdoors — large, outdoor inflatable BIFF screen features films in Beloit and surrounding communities during warm weather
 The Silent Film Showcase — classic silent film accompanied by live orchestra
 BIFF Cares — pairing of films of special social significance with panel discussion
 Kids@BIFF — introducing school-age children to film criticism and filmmaking
 BIFF Sing-a-long — classic film paired with on-screen lyrics
 The Wisconsin/Illinois Showdown — filmmakers from both states pitted against one another in friendly competition
 Filmmaker Workshop — guest filmmaker provides professional insight and guidance into the art and craft of independent filmmaking
 BIFF Classic Film — film festival closing event re-introducing audiences to seminal classic film

Awards
 Power of Film Award
 People's Choice Award
 President’s Award
 Josh Burton Award for Artistry 
 Executive Director Award
 Golden Laurel Award 
 Best Music Video 
 BIFF Documentary Short
 Best Narrative Short
 Best Documentary Feature
 Best Narrative Feature

Notes

External links
 
 Visit Beloit – Beloit's Visitor & Tourism Agency – See what's going on in and around Beloit WI
 Director's Cut – Wisconsin Public Television's Director's Cut

Beloit, Wisconsin
Tourist attractions in Rock County, Wisconsin
Film festivals in Wisconsin
Film festivals established in 2006
2006 establishments in Wisconsin